The 2021 Assam Legislative Assembly election was the 15th quinquennial legislative assembly election held in the Indian state of Assam from March 27 to April 6 in three phases, to elect 126 MLAs to the 15th Assam Legislative Assembly. The votes were counted and the result declared on Sunday, 2 May. The term of the previous Fourteenth Legislative Assembly of Assam ended on 31 May 2021.

The election saw the incumbent BJP-led National Democratic Alliance (NDA) retaining power with 75 seats, which marks the first time a non-INC alliance winning consecutive terms in the state. The Mahajot led by INC won 50 seats, increasing its tally from 26 in 2016. Jailed activist and Raijor Dal founder and President Akhil Gogoi contested the election as an independent candidate and won the Sibsagar seat by a margin of 11,875 votes.

Background

The election in 2016 brought a change of power as the Indian National Congress (INC), which had formed the government under Tarun Gogoi since 2001, lost its majority to the Bharatiya Janata Party led by Sarbananda Sonowal.

Demographics
According to the 2011 census, 61.5% were Hindus, 34.22% were Muslims. Christian minorities (3.7%) are mostly among some of the Scheduled Castes and Tribes (SC/ST) population.

The six communities in Assam – Maran, Matak, Tai Ahom, Chutia, Koch Rajbongshi and the tea tribes have been demanding grant of ST status since a long time. These six communities are numerous and would play a major role in the elections. The Scheduled Tribe population (both ST(Plains) and ST(Hills) combined in Assam is around 13% of which the Bodo people (an indigenous Assamese community) account for 40% and the Scheduled Caste population is about 7.4% of which the Kaibarta and Jal Keot (both indigenous Assamese & migrant Bengali communities) combined account for about 36%.

Out of 32 districts of Assam, 11 are Muslim majority according to the 2011 census. These districts are Dhubri, Goalpara, Barpeta, Morigaon, Nagaon, Hojai, Karimganj, South Salmara–Mankachar, Hailakandi, Darrang and Bongaigaon. Bodos have a population share of 12% and the Kaibarta and Jal Keot have a total share of about 10% (all of which are a part of the indigenous Assamese community). The share of the indigenous Assamese communities in Assam was about 47% in the 2001 census which has reduced to about 40-45% in 2016 as predicted by the experts. Indigenous Assamese Muslims, also known as Khilonjia Muslims, include ethnic groups such as Goria and Moria, and are estimated to be around 40 lakhs in population out of a total 1 crore (4 million out of 10 million) muslims in Assam.

Voter statistics
According to the CEO office, 23,374,087 General electors were eligible to vote in the Assam Assembly election. Of these, 132,081 voters had disabilities, 289,474 voters were above the age of 80, 1,281,918 were newly enrolled voters, and 505,874 voters were in the age group of 18–19 years. Apart from these, there were also 63,074 service voters. More than 1.08 lakh D-voters were barred from casting their votes in this election.

Schedule

Parties and alliances









Candidates

Source:

Surveys and polls

Voting

Turnout

Events
The Election commission suspended four polling officials after a polled Electronic Voting Machine (EVM) in Ratabari constituency in Karimganj district was transported to the strong room through a car belonging to relative of Krishnendu Paul, BJP candidate from neighbouring Patharkandi, after polling party's own car broke down during heavy rain on 9:00pm April 1, 2021. The commission also ordered for a repoll at the polling place where the EVM was taken from, despite all machines were packed and untouched. The vehicle was stopped after a mob was informed and they spotted the EVMs in another vehicle reaching strong room. The video of the incident went viral.

Repoll
On 10 April 2021, the Election Commission of India (ECI) declared the polling held on 1 April 2021 at four polling stations across three Assembly constituencies as 'void' under Section 58(1)(b) of the Representation of the People Act, 1951. The Commission also ordered a repoll in these booths to be held on 20 April 2021.

Results

Results by party/alliance 

 
! colspan="2" rowspan="2" |Alliance
! colspan="2" rowspan="2" |Party
! colspan="3" |Popular vote
! colspan="3" |Seats
|-
!Vote
!%
!±pp
!Contested
! Won
! +/-
|-
|rowspan=4 bgcolor=| 
!rowspan=4 align=left|NationalDemocraticAlliance
|bgcolor=|
|BJP
|6,384,538
|33.21
|3.70
|93
|60
|
|-
|bgcolor=|
|AGP
|1,519,777
|7.91
|0.23
|29
|9
|5
|-
|bgcolor=#F3ED13|
|UPPL
|651,744
|3.39
|3.39
|11
|6
|6
|-
|bgcolor=|
|style="background:#FAD6A5;"|Total
|style="background:#FAD6A5;"|8,556,059
|style="background:#FAD6A5;"|44.51
|style="background:#FAD6A5;"|2.61
|style="background:#FAD6A5;"|126
|style="background:#FAD6A5;"|75
|style="background:#FAD6A5;"|11
|-
|rowspan=9 bgcolor=|
!rowspan=9 align=left|Mahajot
|bgcolor=|
|INC
|5,703,341
|29.67
|1.29
|95
|29
|3
|-
|bgcolor=|
|AIUDF
|1,786,551
|9.29
|3.76
|20
|16
|3
|-
|bgcolor=|
|BPF
|651,073
|3.39
|0.55
|12
|4
|8
|-
|bgcolor=|
|CPI(M)
|160,758
|0.84
|0.29
|2
|1
|1
|-
|bgcolor=#CDCDCD|
|IND
|27,749
|0.14
|—
|1
|0
|—
|-
|bgcolor=|
|CPI
|27,290
|0.14
|0.08
|1
|0
|
|-
|bgcolor=|
|CPI(ML)L
|26,403
|0.14
|0.05
|1
|0
|
|-
|bgcolor=|
|RJD
|13,321
|0.07
|0.07
|1
|0
|
|-
|bgcolor=|
|style="background:#ADD8E6"|Total
|style="background:#ADD8E6"|8,396,486
|style="background:#ADD8E6"|43.68
|style="background:#ADD8E6"|12.72
|style="background:#ADD8E6;"|126
|style="background:#ADD8E6"|50
|style="background:#ADD8E6"|24
|-
!colspan = "2" rowspan=3 align=left|None
|bgcolor="" |
|32 other parties
|911,054
|4.74
|colspan="2"|N/A
|0
|
|-
|bgcolor=""|
|IND
|1,139,423
|5.93
|5.11
|N/A
|1
|
|-
|bgcolor="" |
|NOTA 
|219,578
|1.14
|0.02
| colspan="3" |N/A
|- class="unsortable" style="background-color:#E9E9E9"
! colspan = 4|Total
!19,222,600
!100
! colspan="2" |N/A
!126
!
|-
! colspan="10" |
|-
| colspan="4" |Valid Votes
|19,222,600
|99.52
| colspan="4" rowspan="3" style="background-color:#E9E9E9"  |N/A
|-
| colspan="4"  |Invalid votes
|93,246
|0.48
|-
| colspan="4" |Turnout
|19,315,846
|82.42
|-
| colspan="4"  |Registered voters
|23,436,864
| colspan="5" style="background-color:#E9E9E9"|
|-
|}

Results By district/division

Results by constituency 

Source:

Aftermath
Soon after the election results were declared and the BJP led NDA emerged victorious, it faced the dilemma of who they should make the Chief Minister. While most of the top leaders in the BJP state unit favored incumbent Chief Minister Sarbananda Sonowal, speculations suggested that Himanta Biswa Sarma had more number of elected MLAs of the BJP on his side. Due to prolonged discontent between the two leaders, a BJP legislature party meeting could not be called.

Due to the post poll violence in West Bengal, the BJP top brass delayed decision regarding the chief ministership issue it faced in Assam. After six days of declaration of the results, the BJP central leadership on 8 May called both the leaders to New Delhi to sort out the differences and prevent a factionalism within the party. It held a meeting at BJP national president JP Nadda's house where Home Minister Amit Shah was also present. They met with Sonowal and Himanta separately first and then held another meeting where both of them were present. The meetings lasted for over four hours. At the end, they left the place and told reporters that the a BJP legislature party meeting will be held the day after, where the name of the next Chief Minister will be announced.

The next day Sarbananda Sonowal tendered his resignation letter to Governor Jagdish Mukhi at his residence. In the Library Planetarium in Guwahati, the BJP legislative party meeting was constituted where Sarbananda Sonowal himself proposed the name of Dr. Himanta Biswa Sarma for Chief Minister and he was unanimously elected as the head of the BJP legislative party. Then in the evening, Himanta Biswa Sarma met the Governor at the latter's residence and showed him the letter of support of his MLAs and sought claim to form the next government. The Governor appointed him as Chief Minister-elect and announced that he would take oath on 10 May, Monday.

The next day at Sankardev Kalakhetra in Guwahati, Himanta Biswa Sarma took oath as the 15th Chief Minister of Assam. Along with him 13 other MLAs of the NDA coalition also took oath as ministers in his cabinet.

Bypolls
On 28 September 2021, the Election Commission of India announced the dates of By-election to five assembly constituencies of Assam to be held on 30 October and the results will be counted on 2 November.

By-polls to 'Gossaigaon' and 'Tamulpur' have been necessitated due to the death of the sitting MLAs, while the incumbents of 'Bhapanipur', 'Mariani' and 'Thowra' resigned to join the ruling BJP.

On 10 February 2022, the Election Commission of India announced the date of By-election to Majuli Assembly constituency of Assam to be held on 7 March and the results will be counted on 10 March. By-polls to Majuli constituency have been necessitated as the seat was vacated by Union Minister for Shipping, Ports and AYUSH Sarbananda Sonowal who was elected unopposed to the Rajya Sabha on 27 September 2021.

Candidates

Results

Source:

See also
 2022 Assam municipal elections
 2019 Indian general election in Assam
 2018 Assam panchayat election

Notes

References

External links
 Assam General Legislative Election at the Election Commission of India
 Assam State Election Commission
 Chief Electoral Officer, Assam

2021 State Assembly elections in India
State Assembly elections in Assam
2020s in Assam